Mohana railway station is a railway station on Indore–Gwalior line under the Bhopal railway division of West Central Railway zone. This is situated beside Keketo Dam Road at Badagaonjagir in Gwalior district of the Indian state of Madhya Pradesh.

References

Railway stations in Gwalior district
Bhopal railway division